Thiallela is a genus of snout moths. It was described by Francis Walker in 1863.

Distribution
The genus is distributed in the Oriental and Australian regions, including China, Japan, India, Sri Lanka, Myanmar, Malaysia, Indonesia, New Guinea, Australia and Fiji.

Species
 Thiallela dolokensis Roesler & Küppers, 1981
 Thiallela eduardi Roesler & Küppers, 1981
 Thiallela endochralis Hampson, 1908
 Thiallela epicrociella (Strand, 1919)
 Thiallela escigera (Meyrick, 1932)
 Thiallela hiranoi Yamanaka, 2002
 Thiallela ligeralis (Walker, 1863) (=Luconia pallidobasella Ragonot, 1888)
 Thiallela naevilla H.H. Li & Y.D. Ren, 2006
 Thiallela platantra H.H. Li & Y.D. Ren, 2006
 Thiallela rhodoptila Meyrick, 1932
 Thiallela signifera Walker, 1863

References

 , 2006: "The genus Thiallela Walker, 1863 in China (Lepidoptera: Pyralidae: Phycitinae)". Entomological News. 117(3): 323-331.

Phycitinae
Pyralidae genera